Senator McNulty may refer to:

Francis J. McNulty, Delaware State Senate
James F. McNulty Jr. (1925–2009), Arizona State Senate